The Ocean Project advances ocean conservation in collaboration with aquariums, zoos, museums, youth, and other partners in its growing global network. Since its formation in 1997, The Ocean Project has grown from a handful of founding North American aquariums into the world's most extensive network for advancing ocean education and action. Its growing network includes more than 2,000 partner aquariums, zoos, science, technology, and natural history museums (ZAMs), youth groups, and other education and conservation organizations, in 140 countries that together serve hundreds of millions of visitors each year. The Ocean Project does not market itself, instead "supporting and highlighting" partners by broadcasting their "innovative conservation-related activities."

To help its network of partners achieve their missions, The Ocean Project has conducted public opinion and market research since 1998. The Ocean Project works with its partners to apply the research, provide strategic communications insights, and implement innovative public engagement programs and campaigns to collaboratively create a better future.

Primary Strategies:
1) Enhance capacity at partner institutions
- Support and empower the communications, education, outreach and activation capacities of ZAMs and other partners to effectively engage their members and visitors, as well as leaders in the public and private sectors
2) Scale solutions within and beyond The Ocean Project network  
- Develop and expand partner network, sharing successes and catalyzing more effective approaches, ensuring these efforts add maximum value to local, regional, national, and global conservation movements.

Activities
The Ocean Project catalyzes collective action for our ocean and climate. By collaborating with youth leaders, zoos, aquariums, museums, and other community organizations we are growing a global network that effectively engages the public, informs policymakers, and protects our blue planet.

Priority Initiatives:

1) Collaborative Conservation Campaigns
Based on 20 years of comprehensive public opinion and market research, The Ocean Project works in partnership with leading ZAMs and others to develop, implement, and evaluate innovative conservation campaigns. The emphasis is on improving public engagement and increasing both the number of participating institutions and the impact of their efforts. This work builds upon the success of The Ocean Project's Innovative Solutions Grants + program developed with NOAA, as well as other initiatives, including those supported by the Gordon and Betty Moore Foundation, the SeaLife Trust, and UN Environment.

2) World Ocean Day
The Ocean Project has been growing World Ocean Day since 2002 as a way to raise the profile of the ocean and rally the world every 8 June, with expanded involvement and action year-round. Under The Ocean Project leadership, World Ocean Day has grown from a handful of events in a few countries before 2002 into a global celebration of our ocean. The Ocean Project uses this day with the help of its network to promote restoring and protecting the ocean. Their Annual Report from 2019 shows more than 2000 events in over 140 countries throughout the year. In 2019, the campaign's theme was Gender and the Ocean, pushing for both ocean protections and promote gender equality.

The conservation action focus for 2023 is to call on world leaders to follow through on their commitments to protect 30% of our blue planet by 2030 and make sure it happens The project is now recognized by the United Nations.

3) Youth Initiative
The Ocean Project collaborative youth initiative helps to develop a broad, diverse, active, and united youth constituency for our climate and ocean. Connecting with zoo, aquarium, museums and other youth-focused organizations, the initiative seeks to accelerate youth engagement and leadership worldwide. The Ocean Project empowers youth to become ocean champions and provides opportunities to connect directly with policymakers and corporate leaders. Among The Ocean Project youth activities, the World Ocean Day Youth Advisory Council shapes and grows development of World Ocean Day and leads conservation action year-round. The Sea Youth Rise Up annual advocacy campaign was started on World Ocean Day in 2016, and is designed to connect youth from within and beyond The Ocean Project network and provide a platform for youth to express their ideas directly with decision-makers. The Ocean Project argues that "with nearly half of the world's population under the age of 25, it is imperative that young people step up as leaders at an early age."

References

External links
Official website
 World Oceans Day website

Environmental organizations based in the United States
Marine conservation organizations
Environmental organizations based in Rhode Island